Sylvan Township may refer to the following places in the United States:

 Sylvan Township, Washtenaw County, Michigan
 Sylvan Township, Cass County, Minnesota
 Sylvan Township, Osceola County, Michigan

See also

Sylvania Township (disambiguation)

Township name disambiguation pages